Radoslav Suchý (born April 7, 1976) is a Slovak professional ice hockey defenceman currently playing for Avangard Omsk of the Kontinental Hockey League (KHL). He formerly played in the National Hockey League (NHL) with the Phoenix Coyotes and Columbus Blue Jackets

Playing career
Undrafted, Suchý played in the Quebec Major Junior Hockey League (QMJHL) with the Sherbrooke Faucons and the Chicoutimi Saguenéens. Suchý was then signed by the Phoenix Coyotes on September 26, 1997, and made his professional debut in the 1997–98 season with the Las Vegas Thunder of the International Hockey League (IHL) and the Coyotes' then affiliate, the Springfield Falcons of the American Hockey League (AHL).

Suchý made his NHL debut with the Coyotes in the 1999–2000 season. He played four seasons for the Coyotes before he was traded (along with a sixth-round draft pick) to the Columbus Blue Jackets in exchange for a fourth-round pick. Suchý spent the 2004–05 NHL lockout with HK Aquacity ŠKP Poprad in the Slovak Extraliga.

In the 2005–06 season, Suchý played his only season with the Blue Jackets before leaving at season's end to sign with ZSC Lions of the Swiss National League A (NLA) for the start of the 2006–07 season.

On 31 August 2011, Suchý signed a one-year deal with Avangard Omsk of the Kontinental Hockey League (KHL).

Suchý also played with the Slovakia national team in the 2000, 2003 and 2005 men's World Ice Hockey Championships. He won the silver medal in the 2000 Championship and the bronze medal in the 2003 Championship.

Awards and achievements
1996–97 – QMJHL – Second All-Star Team
1996–97 – Memorial Cup – George Parsons Trophy

Career statistics

Regular season and playoffs

International

References

External links
 
 

1976 births
Living people
Chicoutimi Saguenéens (QMJHL) players
Columbus Blue Jackets players
Ice hockey players at the 2006 Winter Olympics
Las Vegas Thunder players
Olympic ice hockey players of Slovakia
Phoenix Coyotes players
Sherbrooke Faucons players
Slovak ice hockey defencemen
Springfield Falcons players
HK Poprad players
Undrafted National Hockey League players
People from Kežmarok
Sportspeople from the Prešov Region
Slovak expatriate ice hockey players in Canada
Slovak expatriate ice hockey players in the United States
Slovak expatriate ice hockey players in Switzerland
Slovak expatriate ice hockey players in Russia